The 2010–11 season was Lille's 51st season in the top division of French football, and the 9th year of their current spell.

This season was one of the most important in the club's history, as they won both Ligue 1 and the Coupe de France, titles which they had not conquered since 1954 and 1955, respectively.

Players

Transfers in

Transfers out

Appearances, goals and discipline

Source:

Club

Board and staff

Kits
Supplier: umbroSponsor(s): Groupe Partouche

Source: newkits.com

Competitions

Ligue 1

League table

Results summary

Results by round

Matches

Coupe de la Ligue

Coupe de France

UEFA Europa League

Play-off round

Group stage

Knockout phase

Round of 32

References

Lille OSC seasons
Lille OSC
French football championship-winning seasons
Lille OSC